Partecosta veliae is a species of sea snail, a marine gastropod mollusk in the family Terebridae, the auger snails.

Description
Original description: "A small fragile ivory-white coloured shell, with protoconch and the first four and a half whorls of a pale violet colour, this last being a fundamental feature. The teleoconch consists of nine whorls, and the protoconch of one and a half. The whorls are completely smooth with a total absence of spiral or axial sculpture. The columella is smooth and the aperture moderately square. The suture is deep."

Distribution
Locus typicus: "Margaret River, South-West Australia."

References

 Aubry, U. (1991). Due nuove Terebre dal Pacifico / Two new Terebras from Pacific Ocean. La Conchiglia. 258: 32-34

External links
 Fedosov, A. E.; Malcolm, G.; Terryn, Y.; Gorson, J.; Modica, M. V.; Holford, M.; Puillandre, N. (2020). Phylogenetic classification of the family Terebridae (Neogastropoda: Conoidea). Journal of Molluscan Studies

Terebridae
Gastropods described in 1991